, born April 20, 1968, is a Japanese photographer and director of films and music videos. He is represented by Paradigm Agency.

Early life and career

In 1983, in his second year of junior high school, he moved to the United States. He attended Cambridge High School and Northfield Mount Hermon School in Massachusetts and then the School of Constructed Environments at Parsons The New School for Design in New York. At first, as a student, he aimed to enter the business world, but through the experience of seeing others' pleasure when he communicated through drawing at times when his English failed him, he came to be more oriented toward the world of art. Beginning in 1994, he became involved in designing album covers, photography, and directing music videos for many recording artists including Hikaru Utada, SMAP, The Back Horn, Mr. Children, Misia, Southern All Stars, GLAY, and Ayumi Hamasaki. 
     
Kiriya made his feature film debut in 2004, writing and directing the ambitious live action film adaptation of Casshan. The film was among the first to be shot on a digital backlot. In 2009, he wrote and directed his second film, Goemon (a fantasy epic based on the life of Ishikawa Goemon), in which he also appeared in a cameo as Akechi Mitsuhide. In 2015, Kiriya directed his first English-language film, Last Knights, a reimagining of the legend of the forty-seven ronin.

Personal life
Kiriya is a vegetarian. He was wed to Japanese pop artist Hikaru Utada from September 6, 2002, until they divorced on March 2, 2007.

Filmography

Films

Music videos

References

Sources
 Goemon movie official website
 
 

Japanese film directors
1968 births
Living people
People from Kumamoto Prefecture
Japanese music video directors
Japanese photographers